John Butler (died c. 1613), of Sharnbrook, Bedfordshire and Thoby, Essex, was an English politician.
He was a Member (MP) of the Parliament of England for Maldon in 1586 and 1589.

References

16th-century births
1613 deaths

Year of birth unknown

Year of death uncertain
People from Sharnbrook
People from the Borough of Brentwood
English MPs 1586–1587
English MPs 1589
Members of Parliament for Maldon